Fairhaven Township is one of twelve townships in Carroll County, Illinois, USA.  As of the 2020 census, its population was 757 and it contained 399 housing units.

Geography

Cities
 Chadwick

Unincorporated towns
 Fair Haven
(This list is based on USGS data and may include former settlements.)

Cemeteries
The township contains these four cemeteries: Black Oak Lutheran, Chadwick Methodist, Fairhaven and Hope Brethren.

Major highways
  Illinois Route 78
  Illinois Route 88

Demographics
As of the 2020 census there were 757 people, 397 households, and 242 families residing in the township. The racial makeup of the township was 96.70% White, 0.26% African American, 0.00% Native American, 0.79% Asian, 0.00% Pacific Islander, 0.00% from other races, and 2.25% from two or more races. Hispanic or Latino of any race were 2.25% of the population.

There were 397 households, out of which 17.90% had children under the age of 18 living with them, 47.61% were married couples living together, 9.07% had a female householder with no spouse present, and 39.04% were non-families. 32.70% of all households were made up of individuals, and 9.80% had someone living alone who was 65 years of age or older. The average household size was 2.09 and the average family size was 2.62.

The township's age distribution consisted of 16.3% under the age of 18, 6.4% from 18 to 24, 20.8% from 25 to 44, 38.2% from 45 to 64, and 18.4% who were 65 years of age or older. The median age was 50.4 years. For every 100 females, there were 118.5 males. For every 100 females age 18 and over, there were 108.7 males.

The median income for a household in the township was $51,250, and the median income for a family was $63,333. Males had a median income of $36,683 versus $25,530 for females. The per capita income for the township was $27,504. About 7.0% of families and 11.6% of the population were below the poverty line, including 33.3% of those under age 18 and 2.6% of those age 65 or over.

School districts
 Chadwick-Milledgeville Community Unit School District 399

Political districts
 Illinois' 16th congressional district
 State House District 71
 State Senate District 36

References
 
 United States Census Bureau 2007 TIGER/Line Shapefiles
 United States National Atlas

External links
 City-Data.com
 Illinois State Archives
 Carroll County official site

Townships in Carroll County, Illinois
Townships in Illinois